Yatağan is a town in Serinhisar District of Denizli Province in the Aegean Region of Turkey. It was named after a swordsmith called Yatağan Baba, the namesake of the yatagan sword. Yatağan Baba's tomb is one of the tourist attractions.

External links
  

Towns in Turkey
Populated places in Denizli Province